The Mulgray Twins are the authors of a series of crime novels featuring undercover Customs investigator D.J. Smith and her sidekick, a trained sniffer-cat called Gorgonzola.  Their novels are quirky and gently humorous.

Biography 
Helen and Morna Mulgray (born 1939 in Joppa, Edinburgh) are identical twins who took up writing after they retired from teaching English at two neighbouring secondary schools near Edinburgh. Helen, inspiring the children of Gorebridge and Newtongrange at Greenhall High School, with Morna doing the same for the children of Loanhead and Bonnyrigg at Lasswade.

Bibliography 
 No Suspicious Circumstances (2007)
 Under Suspicion (2008)
 Above Suspicion (2010)
 Suspects All (2011)
 No. 1 Suspect (2012)
 Acting Suspiciously (2014)

External links 
 The Twins' website
 Scotsman article
 Interviewed on BBC Radio 4's Woman's Hour (10 August 2007)
 Interview at Iconocast

1939 births
Alumni of the University of Edinburgh
Living people
Writers from Edinburgh
Scottish crime fiction writers
Scottish twins